Salmon is any of several species of fish of the family Salmonidae.

Salmon may also refer to:

 Salmon as food

Fish
Australian salmon (Arripis trutta)
Blackhead salmon (Narcetes stomias)
Indian salmon (Eleutheronema tetradactylum)
Beaked salmon (Gonorynchus)
King threadfin (Polydactylus macrochir), also known as king salmon, threadfin salmon or just salmon

Places in the United States and Canada
Salmon, Idaho, United States, a city
Salmon Bay, a body of water in Seattle, Washington, United States
Salmon Site, a nuclear test site in Mississippi, United States
Salmon River (disambiguation), various rivers in the United States and Canada
Salmon Creek (disambiguation), various creeks in the United States
Salmon Brook (Merrimack River tributary), Massachusetts, United States
Salmon Glacier, British Columbia, Canada
Salmon Inlet, British Columbia

Personal name
Salmon (surname), including a list of people with the name
Salmon (given name), a list of people and a biblical figure

Vessels
HMS Salmon, two ships of the British Royal Navy
Salmon-class submarine, a class of submarines of the United States Navy
USS Salmon, three submarines of the United States Navy

Other uses
Salmon (color), a pale pink-orange color
Salmon (protocol), a computing protocol
Salmon Air, a commuter airline based in Idaho, United States
Salmon High School, Salmon, Idaho

See also
Salmon House (disambiguation)
Salmonfly, a family of giant stoneflies
Salmon fly, artificial flies tied to catch Atlantic Salmon
Salmon fly patterns, artificial flies tied to imitation giant stoneflies

Salmond (disambiguation)
Salman (disambiguation)
Salmone (disambiguation)
Sammon (disambiguation)